The Tanaga Pass is a strait between Tanaga Island and the Delarof Islands the Aleutian Islands of Alaska. Tidal currents commonly range between two and three knots in the pass.

"The direction and velocity of the current is radically affected by the land areas and the banks. It appears that the flood is diverted by the chain of islands – Skagul to Unalga – and the relatively shoal water between them to an east and west direction in moving around this chain. It was observed that south of Skagul Island the flood sets about northeast, east of this island it sets north, and north of the island it sets north to northwest.

"With erratic currents of this nature, dead reckoning cannot be depended on and the navigator may find his vessel  or more off his reckoning after a run of 1 hour. A minimum current averaging about 0.8 knot sets north to northeast."

References

External links
 NOAA Nautical Chart 16465, Tanaga Island to Nalga Island

Straits of Aleutians West Census Area, Alaska
Straits of Alaska